Debrah Farentino (born September 30, 1959) is an American actress, producer and journalist. She began her career starring in the CBS daytime soap opera Capitol from 1982 to 1987, before moving to prime time with a female leading role in the ABC comedy drama series Hooperman (1987-88).

Farentino had starring roles in a number of dramatic series in 1990s, include Equal Justice (1990-91), Earth 2 (1994-95), EZ Streets (1996-97) and Get Real (1999-2000). Her other notable credits include 1993 comedy film Son of the Pink Panther, 1999 miniseries Storm of the Century, and well as Syfy comedy-drama Eureka (2006-2012).

Early life
Born Deborah Mullowney in Lucas Valley, California, Farentino attended Miller Creek Junior High School and Terra Linda High School in San Rafael. She went on to pursue her undergraduate education at San Jose State before transferring to UCLA and was a model for Ford before becoming an actress.

Career
Farentino began her acting career in 1982 when she was cast in the TV series Capitol. She has since appeared in over fifty movies and TV shows, including Hooperman (1987-1989) and Son of the Pink Panther (1993). Perhaps her most famous role was as Devon Adair in NBC's SciFi series Earth 2, the first female commander depicted in a science fiction work.

Over the span of four decades, she has guest starred in many television programs, including NYPD Blue (1994), the revival of The Outer Limits (1996), JAG (2002), CSI: Miami (2003), and Hawaii Five-0 (2011). Her most recent roles include as Isabelle Matia-Paris in the ABC series Wildfire and Beverly Barlowe in the Syfy Channel series Eureka.

Farentino has produced specials for PBS/WXEL, receiving a Suncoast Emmy nomination for "Saving Americas Heroes”. She has also appeared on CBS news as a special correspondent covering Guardian Angel units and has embedded multiple times with USAF Special Forces rescue units in Afghanistan.

She was chosen as one of People Magazine's "50 Most Beautiful People" in 1995, while pregnant with daughter Sophie.

Personal life
In 1979 she married Scott Staples. They divorced in 1983. In 1985, she married actor James Farentino, who was more than 20 years her senior. Their marriage ended in 1988. Her third husband was producer Tony Adams in 1992-1994. Later, she married director Gregory Hoblit, but they divorced in 2009. She has two daughters; one is the photographer Molly Adams.

As of 2018, she resides in Easton, Connecticut.

Filmography

Film

Television

References

External links

 http://www.wellsmartservice.com/about/debrah-farentino/

1959 births
20th-century American actresses
21st-century American actresses
American film actresses
American television actresses
Actresses from California
Living people